Pedro Barra García was a Chilean football manager and player who played as a forward.

Career
A footballer from Chile, he played in Mexico for Germania FV and América (1933–34).

He was the first Chilean to play for América before players such as Osvaldo Castro, Roberto Hodge, Reinaldo Navia, Iván Zamorano, among others.

He also coached América in the 1936–37 season, reaching 40.91 percent of performance with eleven matches.

Personal life
Due to his origin, he was known as El Chileno (The Chilean) in Mexican football.

Legacy
In the 1930s, he served as representative of América at Liga Mayor and was the driving force behind the "night football" in Mexico, since matches were played during the day at that time. The first match played at night faced Atlante and España on 28 March 1940 for the 1939–40 Copa México.

References

Date of birth missing
Place of birth missing
Date of death missing
Place of death missing
Chilean footballers
Chilean expatriate footballers
Club América footballers
Chilean expatriate sportspeople in Mexico
Expatriate footballers in Mexico
Association football forwards
Chilean football managers
Chilean expatriate football managers
Club América managers
Expatriate football managers in Mexico